SereneAir is a privately owned Pakistani airline that began operating services in January 2017. SereneAir operates scheduled domestic flights within Pakistan and its first international flight departed for Sharjah, United Arab Emirates on 16 March 2021.

History
The Pakistan Civil Aviation Authority granted a license in March 2016 that permitted the establishment of SereneAir. The airline received its first aircraft, a Boeing 737-800, in November 2016. The airline started operations on 29 January 2017, a week after obtaining its air operator's certificate. The inaugural flight departed Islamabad for Karachi on 29 January 2017. Serene Air took first delivery of Airbus A330-200 on 27 August 2020.

Corporate affairs
SereneAir is a privately owned airline headquartered in Islamabad. It's chief executive officer is Air Vice Marshal(R) Muhammad Safdar Khan.

Destinations
As of November 2022, SereneAir flies to the following destinations in Pakistan:

Fleet
As of December 2022, SereneAir operates the following fleet of aircraft.

See also
AirSial
airblue

References

External links

 Serene Aairways Online Booking

Airlines established in 2016
Airlines of Pakistan
Companies based in Islamabad
Pakistani companies established in 2016